Jakob Sverdrup (10 April 1881 – 21 November 1938) was a Norwegian philologist and lexicographer.

Personal life
He was born in Leikanger as a son of the bishop and politician Jakob Sverdrup (1845–1899). He was a brother of Georg Johan Sverdrup, uncle of historian Jakob Sverdrup, a first cousin of Harald Ulrik Sverdrup, Jr, and Leif Sverdrup, a nephew of Georg Sverdrup and Edvard Sverdrup, grandson of Harald Ulrik Sverdrup, Sr, grandnephew of Johan Sverdrup and great-grandson of Jacob Liv Borch Sverdrup.

Career
He was hired as a lecturer at the University of Oslo in 1917, took the dr.philos. degree in 1928 with the thesis Zum germanischen Verbalsystem, and was promoted to professor of Germanic philology in 1929. Among his works were a German-Norwegian dictionary, released in two volumes in 1933 and 1936.

References

1881 births
1938 deaths
Norwegian philologists
Germanists
Linguists of Germanic languages
Norwegian lexicographers
Academic staff of the University of Oslo
People from Leikanger
20th-century philologists
20th-century lexicographers